The Congress Hall is a 2,880-seat theatre at the Palace of Culture and Science in Warsaw, Poland. It was opened in 1955.

Renovation
The hall was closed for approximately 2 years from July 2014 for renovations, modernisation and improvements for fire safety before re-opening in 2016. The initial cost estimate was 45 million złoty.

Music performances and festivals
Past performances have included shows by Marlene Dietrich (1964 and 1966), King Crimson, Procol Harum, Pat Metheny, The Rolling Stones (1967), Paul Anka, Charles Aznavour, Juliette Gréco, Lou Reed, Keith Jarrett, Joe Cocker, Leonard Cohen (1985), Diana Krall, and Yes. More recent musical performances have included Tangerine Dream (in 1997), Patti Smith (in 2002), Kraftwerk (in 2004), Dead Can Dance (2005), Mieskuoro Huutajat (2007) and Katie Melua (2014).

The theatre has hosted closed-congresses of companies such as Microsoft, Nationale Nederlanden, Commercial Union, and Zepter International. In 2006, the theatre hosted the finals of the Miss World 2006 beauty pageant.

In September 2014, the renovation of the building began in order to adapt it to fire protection requirements. The renovation cost was supposed to be about PLN 45 million. However, it turned out that the cost and scope of the work were underestimated, and in the spring of 2016 their contractor declared bankruptcy. In December 2017, the management board of the PKiN management company announced a tender for a new concept for the modernization of the hall. The cost of the renovation was estimated at over PLN 100 million, and its completion in the years 2022–2024. In August 2018, the Council of the Capital City of Warsaw has allocated PLN 183 million for the renovation of the Congress Hall, which has been included in the long-term financial perspective. In 2019, the competition for the modernization of the hall was concluded. In 2021, it turned out that the amount reserved by the city was too small. The earliest completion date for the renovation is around 2025.

See also
History of Poland (1945-1989)
Socialist realism
Music of Poland

References

Theatres in Warsaw
Music venues completed in 1967
1967 establishments in Poland